Back Creek is an estuary of Delaware Bay in Cumberland County, New Jersey in the United States.

Abbots Creek and Ogden Creek join to form Back Creek, which travels for 3.7 miles (6 km) to Nantuxent Cove of Delaware Bay.

Tributaries 
 Abbots Creek
 Ogden Creek

See also 
 List of rivers of New Jersey

References 

Rivers of Cumberland County, New Jersey
Rivers of New Jersey
Tributaries of Delaware Bay